LaserWash is a brand name of a brand of touchless in-bay automatic vehicle wash system, or car wash.  The name LaserWash is a registered trademark of PDQ Manufacturing. LaserWash vehicle wash systems are manufactured in  De Pere, Wisconsin and sold throughout North America and in over 40 countries.

History
The first LaserWash vehicle wash system, branded LaserWash 4000, was manufactured and sold in 1989.  This was the sole in-bay automatic product line for PDQ until a second system was released in 2000, the LaserWash G5, later superseded by the "LaserWash G5-S".  In 2005, the LaserWash M5 was released to be the eventual replacement for the LaserWash 4000. PDQ continues to use the LaserWash trademark worldwide today and manufactures the 7th-generation LaserWash 360 Plus and LaserWash AutoXpress.

LaserWash Trademark
The original LaserWash trademark application at the United States Patent and Trademark Office (USPTO) was filed by PDQ Manufacturing, Inc of Green Bay, Wisconsin on August 29, 1994. The description provided to the USPTO was for "commercial machines used to wash motor vehicles."  The original trademark was cancelled on August 7, 2002 and has been superseded by the word LASERWASH. Delaware Capital Formation, Inc in Wilmington, DE, representing PDQ Manufacturing through Dover Corporation, is the current registered owner of the LaserWash trademark.

Among other global trademark registrations, in Australia, the Laserwash mark is registered by Delaware Capital Formation with IP Australia under Trademark Registration Numbers 1117150 and 1940818.

Controversy 
LaserWash systems are able to be remotely controlled and configured over the internet via a web interface. Owners are able to see the status of the car wash and send commands to the machine. At a Black Hat conference in 2017, it was shown that the web interface could be compromised and allow hackers to access the equipment at sites not properly employing external network firewalls or passwords. PDQ has since issued product bulletins and software revisions prompting users to block unauthorized access to their network, including automated routine network hygiene.

References

External links 
 PDQ Manufacturing Inc, the manufacturer of LaserWash

Products introduced in 1989